Mohamed Abu Abdullah (born March 1, 1981) is a track and field sprint athlete who competes internationally for Bangladesh.

Abu Abdullah represented Bangladesh at the 2008 Summer Olympics in Beijing. He competed at the 100 metres sprint and placed 8th in his heat without advancing to the second round. He ran the distance in a time of 11.07 seconds.

References

External links
 
 

1981 births
Living people
Bangladeshi male sprinters
Olympic athletes of Bangladesh
Athletes (track and field) at the 2008 Summer Olympics